Eulima tulearensis is a species of sea snail, a marine gastropod mollusk in the family Eulimidae. The species is one of a number within the genus Eulima.

Distribution

This species occurs in the following locations:

 Madagascar

References

External links
 To World Register of Marine Species

tulearensis
Gastropods described in 1910